Angamaly (Aṅkamāli), Malayalam : അങ്കമാലി Situated about  north of the city centre, the town lies at the intersection of Main Central Road (MC Road) and National Highway 544. MC Road, which starts from Thiruvananthapuram ends at Angamaly at its intersection with NH 544.  Cochin International Airport is less than 10KM away from the town of Angamaly.

Originally established as a panchayat in May 1952, Angamaly became a municipality in April 1978 and is also a Legislative Assembly constituency from 1965 in the Ernakulam district.

The area is known for the Angamaly police firing in 1959, when police opened fire on protesters who had been demonstrating against Kerala's communist government.

Angamaly is one of the ancient Christian centres of Kerala. There are eighteen and half "Sharries" around Angamaly  and there is a history of Buddhist monks in the area.

Nayathode near Angamaly is the birth place of Great poet G. Sankara Kurup, (3 June 1901 – 2 February 1978) better known as Mahakavi G, who was an Indian poet, essayist and literary critic of Malayalam literature. Known as one of the greats of Malayalam poetry, he was the first recipient of the Jnanpith Award―the highest Indian literary honor, when it was instituted in 1965.

Importance

Angamaly is well connected by all means of transport. Cochin International Airport is in the vicinity of Angamaly.

Angamaly railway station, where all major trains stop, serves as a major connectivity point for people from the eastern side of the district to the rest of the country. The railway station is the fifth busiest in Greater Kochi in terms of passenger footfalls and revenue generated, after Ernakulam Junction railway station, Ernakulam Town railway station, Aluva railway station and Tripunithura railway station.
There is a proposed railway line from Angamaly to Sabarimala, which will connect the high-ranges with the low land. Progress toward completing the new line is slow as a result of various regional and political issues. The project has however, obtained a new lease of life after the Government of Kerala agreeing to bear half the cost for the project in January 2021.

National Highway 544 connecting Kanyakumari to Salem passes through Angamaly. The NH 17 which connects Kochi and Mumbai is 20 kilometers from Angamaly. Main Central Road (M.C. Road) connecting Central Kerala to Kerala capital serves as an important road connecting many towns in the eastern side of the state.

'Manjaly Thodu' which flows through Angamaly, was a major waterway and Angadikadavu near the old church was an important trade centre in the olden days where spices, rice, bamboo and other agriculture and hill products were sent to the old port of Mozoories. Manjaly Thodu is part of the new National Waterways programme and is getting developed.

Angamaly is enriched with cultural and devotional centres. There are many old churches which are centuries old with well defined frescoes and other murals which are also known for certain historical meetings and decisions that shaped the modern Christianity in the entire India. The new Catholic church built at the heart of the town is regarded as the biggest of its kind in India. Vembiliyam Mahadev temple, Paddupusha Bhagavathi temple, Thirunayathodu temple, Krishnaswamy temple, Vengoor Durga Devi temple, Kidangooru temple, Kothakulangara temple, Jain temple, Elavuru temple, Muzhikulam temple are all Hindu pilgrim centres near to Angamaly. There are also several hospitals and educational institutions in the locality.

Angamaly has a state-owned industrial estate at its southern end which has numerous renowned factories. Kerala State Bamboo Corporation Ltd. has its headquarters at Angamaly. There are several small-scale cracker manufacturing units in the surrounding areas.
Angamaly have a decent contribution to literature in form of  books like Kaatadiyanthramgal.

The importance of Angamaly today is mainly revolved around it being a stone's throw away from Kochi city. The town is on the verge of being assimilated with the fast growing city, with the proposed New Kochi Bypass project (from Karayamparambu to Nettoor) starting just north of, and Kochi Metro phase 3 being proposed to Angamaly as well as Cochin International Airport. 

The proposed Kochi Global Industrial Finance and Trade (GIFT) city under the Kochi-Bengaluru National Industrial Corridor is proposed at Ayyampuzha, which is close to Angamaly. These developments are expected to catapult Angamaly as a very important part of Kochi city in the immediate future.

History

Although recorded history does not exist about the origins of Angamaly, legends and local folklore attribute the name Angamaly to the grounds where battles (Ankam in Malayalam language) were conducted at a myal (attributed as a plain ground). Hence a very old battle ground.

Another legend is that the word Angamaly is derived from Akamaly I.e.inland port area.

Several old coins and other artefacts found from the region tells this area was predominant with Buddhists and Jains in very old time. The 18 and a 1/2 'viharas' around Angamaly is a proof for this. Malayatoor, which is Christian devotional centre, is very near to Angamaly. It is said that St. Thomas, the Apostlte who was deputed to the region by Jesus Christ came via Angadikadavu in Angamaly using Manjali Thodu to come from Kodungaloor port at AD 58. There are evidence for the churches in the locality built as early as AD 409 and AD 822. It was the headquarters of Mar Abraham, Assyrian-Chaldean Catholic Archbishop of Angamaly and Hind in the sixteenth century.

Kalady, the birthplace of Adi Sri Sankara is only 7 kilometers from here, it is there the Sanskrit University situates.

Historians records that a massive flood around the 16th century AD made the Angamaly river to change the course forced itself to flow through Aluva area. Now the river is called Chalakudy River and is the fifth longest river in Kerala. Meanwhile, the river in Angamaly became a lesser canal and there by got the name Manjaly Thodu.

Angamaly Police firing

The Angamaly Firing was an incident that took place in Angamaly, Kerala, on 13 June 1959, when police opened fire on protesters who had been demonstrating against Kerala's communist government. Seven people were killed resulting in the intensification of Vimochana Samaram, a protest against the then communist led government. Incidentally, it happened on the 50th birthday of E. M. S. Namboothiripad, the then Chief Minister of Kerala.

Places of interest
Thattupara church Marigri- St. Thomas is believed to have landed in Kerala at Kodungallur (Cranganore) in AD 52. It is believed that St. Thomas held prayer at this church when he landed in Kerala. Oral tradition says that while travelling to Malayattor, he passed through this way.
 Mar Hormiz Syro-Malabar Catholic Church, Angamaly - Old Cathedral of Saint Thomas Christians. It was established in 1570 by Mar Abraham, the last Assyrian-Chaldean Metropolitan to reach Malabar Coast and the First Metropolitan Archbishop of Syro-Malabar Catholic ArchDiocese of Angamaly. It was dedicated to Hormizd, a seventh century East Syrian saint. Mar Abraham constructed his new Cathedral in 1579.                              
Assemblies of God in India, Angamaly South.
 St. George Syro-Malabar Catholic Basilica, Angamaly – The church was originally built in AD 450, was renovated to become the biggest of its kind in the South India.
India Pentecostal Church of God, Piravom.
 St. Thomas Syro-Malabar Catholic Church, Malayattoor – St. Thomas is believed to have landed in Kerala at Kodungallur (Cranganore) in AD 52. It is believed that St. Thomas held prayer at this church when he landed in Kerala. Oral tradition says that while travelling through Malayattor, faced with hostile natives, he fled to the hilltop. The Christian pilgrim center has been designated by the Vatican as an International Shrine.
St. Mary's Jacobite Syrian Church, It is an ancient church and one of the most prominent Jacobite churches in Kerala.
 Kodanad –  known for its Elephant Training Center is 25 kilometers from Angamaly. Elephant ride as well as a mini zoo is part of this.

 Thirunayathode Sivanarayana Temple – Built by Cheraman Perumal Nayanar in the 800s AD.
Cochin International Airport - Angamaly is the nearest city to Cochin International Airport. ( away)
 Kallil Temple  is a revered Jain shrine established from the 9th century. Kallil literally meaning "in stone" is a temple located in a vast expanse of 28 acres. This rock cut temple can be reached after a short trek up 120 steps. The temple is managed presently by Chenkottukonam Sree Ramadasashramam. It was originally owned by the Kallil Pisharody family and hence name Kallil Devi temple. Dedicated to Durga Devi, the temple has a structure of Brahma carved at the peak of the rock. The triad of Brahma, Vishnu and Shiva are all worshiped in this temple. This shrine also enshrines Jain deities namely Padmavati Devi (worshipped as Durga Devi by devotees), Parshvanath and Mahavira. It is believed that Kallil family had once followed Jainism.

Industry

 Transformers And Electricals Kerala Ltd.(TELK) is Located in Angamaly, producing and setting up High Voltage equipment in the region. Started off as a technical and financial collaboration between Govt. of Kerala and Hitachi of Japan, now it is a JV between Govt. of Kerala and NTPC Limited, TELK manufactures Extra High Voltage Power Transformers (up to 315 MVA, 420 kV) and other equipment (CT, PT, Bushings) up to 420 kV class.

Politics
Angamaly  is a constituency in the Kerala legislative assembly .The Angamaly assembly constituency is part of Chalakudy (Lok Sabha constituency).

Angamaly is a municipality.

Location

Demographics

As of 2011 India census, Angamaly had a population of 33,465. Males constitute 49% of the population and females 51%. Angamaly has an average literacy rate of 96.47%, higher than the national average of 74.04%; 9% of the population is under 6 years of age.religion-christianity-71.89%, hinduism-27.03%, islam-0.83%.

Schools

Colleges

Gallery

See also 
Kunnappillissery
Thekke Kidangoor

References

External links

 http://www.angamalymunicipality.in

 
Cities and towns in Ernakulam district
Suburbs of Kochi